Mary McCarthy (not to be confused with another screenwriter—Mary Eunice McCarthy) was an American screenwriter active in the 1930s and 1940s.

Biography 
Born and raised in San Francisco, California, to Irish parents (just like the similarly named screenwriter), McCarthy pursued a career as a schoolteacher in San Mateo, California, before giving it all up to run a nonprofit sandwich stand. She then became a political activist, stumping the state for the Democratic Party and going toe-to-toe with the Ku Klux Klan. Eventually she headed to Hollywood to pursue a career as a scenarist in the mid-1930s; her first big credit was on Theodora Goes Wild, a 1936 comedy starring Irene Dunne.

Selected filmography 
Curley (1947)
Sister Kenny (1946)
Amateur Detective (1939)
Life Returns (1935)

References

Further reading

Articles
 Bennett, Buford Gordon (April 20, 1925). "Two Sketches Top This Week's Bill at the Orpheum; Mary Carr Stars in Playlet by S.F. Writer" The San Francisco Examiner. p. 11
 "With Universal". Hollywood Filmograph. September 3, 1932. p. 3
 "'Theodora' to Swerling". The Hollywood Reporter. May 1, 1935. p. 4
 Special to the Times (November 28, 1936). "Screen Writer Arrives at Mills". The San Mateo Times. p. 2
 Safford, Virginia (November 2, 1943). "Names Make News". The Minneapolis Star. p. 17
 Coons, Robbin (January 13, 1944). "Sister Kenny Gets Movie Treatment; Film Will Portray Her Work With Infantile Paralysis". Macon Chronicle-Herald. p. 2
 "Indian's Love on 'Matinee'". The Paducah Sun. August 25, 1957. p. 38

Books
 Masterson, James; Eberly, Joyce E., editors (1959) Writings on American History, 1957; Volume II of the Annual Report of the American Historical Association for the Year 1959. Washington, DC : U.S. Government Printing Office. 1959. p. 529

Year of birth missing
Place of birth missing
Year of death missing
Place of death missing
American women screenwriters
Screenwriters from California
Writers from San Francisco
20th-century American screenwriters
20th-century American women writers